The Rhum Gas Field is a gas field owned halfly between UK's BP and Iran, located  north-east of Aberdeen in UK, in 109 metres (350 ft) of water. It's gas production and export began on 20 December 2005.

Development of the Rhum project cost approximately £350 million. Prior to the start of production, Rhum was the largest remaining undeveloped gas reservoir in the UK Continental Shelf. The original partners in the Rhum field were BP (Operator) 50% and Iranian Oil Company (U.K.) Limited (a subsidiary of the National Iranian Oil Company) 50%.
The Rhum field is a high-temperature, high-pressure reservoir, experiencing down-hole temperatures of 150 °C and pressures of 12,700 psi. By comparison, the Bruce gas field, records temperatures of 99 °C and pressures of 6,000 psi.  

Rhum, which lies in block 3/29, was discovered in 1977 by well 3/29a-2. An earlier well (3/29-1) which was drilled in 1973, was abandoned due to the high pressure gas. With the combination of a high pressure, high temperature (HPHT) gas reservoir developed 
using a long distance subsea tie-back, exploitation of Rhum is regarded by BP as a world first. 

Plateau production of 300 million standard cubic feet per day is expected from the field. Rhum is expected to access recoverable reserves of 800 billion cubic feet of gas (23 billion cubic metres).

The field is tied back to the Serica-operated Bruce platform via a 28-mile (44 km) long  High Integrity Pipeline Protection System (HIPPS) protected pipe-in-pipe main export pipeline. New gas processing facilities were installed on the existing Bruce Compression Reception Centre (CR) platform to process gas from Rhum. Gas is exported from Bruce via the Frigg pipeline system to St Fergus. Associated condensate is piped via Bruce into the Forties Pipeline System.

References

Natural gas fields in the United Kingdom
Iran–United Kingdom relations
National Iranian Oil Company